This article lists Black queer, lesbian, gay, bisexual, non-binary, polyamory, or transgender-related films. The list includes movies, documentaries, and TV/web series that deal with or feature significant Black queer characters or issues as an important plot device. The English film title, original title, country of origin and production year are listed.

Movies 
A Girl Like Grace (US 2015)
 As I Am (US 2019)
Alles Wird Gut (Everything Will Be Fine) (Germany 1998)
 Blackbird (US 2014)
 Black Aura on an Angel (2004)
 Being 17 (France 2016)
 Bessie (US 2015)
 Blind Faith (US 1998)
 Brother to Brother (US 2004)
 Brooklyn’s Bridge to Jordan (US 2005)
 bwoy (US/Jamaica 2016)
 The Color Purple (US 1985) 
 Change (US 2011)
 Children of God (Bahamas 2010)
 Dakan (Guinea 2006)
 Dear White People (US 2014)
 Dirty Laundry (US 2006)
 Family (2008)
 Finding Me (US 2009)
 Friend of the World (US 2020)
 Get On The Bus (US 1996)
 Green Book (US 2018) 
 Gun Hill Road (2011)
 The Happy Sad (US 2013)
 Hearts Beat Loud (US 2013)
 Henry Gamble's Birthday Party (US 2015)
 Holiday Heart (2000)
 Karmen Gei (Senegal 2001)
 KickOff (UK 2011)
 Kinky Boots (UK 2005)
 Looking for Langston (UK 1989)
 Madame Sata (Brazil 2002)
 Mississippi Damned (US 2009)
 Moonlight (US 2016)
 Naz & Maalik (US 2015)
 Noah's Arc: Jumping The Broom (US 2008)
 Parallel Sons (US 1995)
 Pariah (US 2011)
 Play The Devil (Trinidad & Tobago 2018)
 Punks (US 2001)
 Rag Tag (UK/Nigeria 2018)
 Rafiki (Kenya 2018)
 The Reception (US 2005)
 Reluctantly Queer (Ghana 2016)
 Rent (US 2005)
 Rivers Wash Over Me (US 2009)
 Rude (Canada 1995)
 Sarang Song (US 2006)
Saturday Church (US 2017)
 Savage Roses: Locas 4 Life (US 2002)
 The Skinny (US 2012)
 She Hate Me (US 2004)
 Slow (US 2011)
 Starrbooty (US 2007)
 Stories of Our Lives (Kenya 2014)
 Strange Fruit (US 2004)
 Stud Life (US 2012)
 Tangerine (US 2015)
 The Things You Think I'm Thinking (Canada, 2017)
 To Wong Foo, Thanks for Everything, Julie Newmar (US 1995)
 The Watermelon Woman (USA 1996)
 The Women of Brewster Place (US 1989)
The Wound (South Africa 2017)
 Young Soul Rebels (UK 1991)

Documentaries 
 The Abominable Crime (Jamaica 2013)
 The Aggressives (US 2005)
 All God’s Children (US 1996)
 Black is...Black Ain't (US 1995)
 Black Nations/Queer Nations? (US 1995)
 Black./Womyn: Conversations with Lesbians of African Descent (US 2008)
 Born in Flames (US 1983)
 Brother Outsider: The Life of Bayard Rustin (US 2002)
 Butch Mystique (US 2003)
 Call Me Kuchu (Uganda 2012)
 Check It (US 2016)
 Difficult Love (South Africa 2010)
 Dream Deferred: The Sakia Gunn Film Project (US 2008)
 Forbidden Games: The Justin Fashanu Story (UK 2017)
 Game Face (US 2015)
 How Do I Look (US 2006)
 I Am Not Your Negro (US 2016)
 Jumpin’ the Broom: The New Covenant (US 2006)
 Kiki (US 2016)
 The New Black (US 2013)
 My Mama Said Yo Mama's A Dyke (US 2010)
 Paris is Burning (US 1990)
 Pick Up the Mic (US 2006)
 Portrait of Jason (US 1967)
 Still Black: A Portrait of Black Transmen (US 2008)
 The Edge of Each Other's Battles: The Vision of Audre Lorde (US 2002)
 Tchindas (Spain/Cape Verde 2015)
 Tongues Untied (US 1989)
 Treasure: From Tragedy to Trans Justice Mapping a Detroit Story (US 2015)
 U People (2009)
 White Shadows (US 2007)
 You Are Not Alone (US 2012)
 Voguing: The Message (US 1989) 
 Woubi Cheri (France/Ivory Coast 1998)

TV/Web Series 
 Between Women (US 2011)
 Behind Closed Doors (US 2017)
Black Lightning (US 2018)
 The Blues Blues (US 2014)
 Bois (US 2013) 
Brooklyn Nine-Nine (US 2013) 
 Brown Girls (US 2017)
 Change the Sheets (US 2016) 
 Come Take a Walk With Me (US 2012)
 Crazy Sexy Cool (US 2014) 
 Dear White People (US 2017)
 District Heat (US 2014)
 Dyke Central (US 2015)
 Entangled With You (US 2013)
Euphoria (US 2019)
 Femme (US 2015)
 Girl Play (2012)
 Girls Just Don't Do That (US 2016) 
Hollywood (US 2020) 
How To Get Away With Murder (US 2014) 
 If I was your girl (US 2012)
 The Industry (2013)
 It's Complicated (US 2016)
 Ladies, Lust, Love (US 2012)
 Let's Talk Lesbian (US 2013)
 Lez-B-Honest (US 2011)
 Lipstick: The Series (US 2015)
 Livin' It Up (US 2015) 
 Lovers & Friends (US 2008)
 Love, Lives, and Lesbians of Mobile (US 2013)
 Love and Lesbians NY (US 2015) 
 Love of the Hustle (US 2014)
LesBiReal (US 2016)
 The Lez Factor (US 2013)
 The Peculiar Kind (US 2012)
 Master of None (US 2015)
 Momma'z Boi (US 2013)
 Noah’s Arc (US 2005)
 No Shade (US 2015)
 NYGTV (US 2014)
 Oops (US 2011)
Pandora's Box (US 2015)
 POSE (US 2018)
 Refracted Reflections (US 2013)
She's Gotta Have It (US 2018)
 The SideLine (US 2014)
 Social Theory (US 2013) 
 Skye's The Limit (US 2013) 
StudvilleTV (US 
 Sunny Reign (US 2012)
 T.R.A.D.E. IT ALL (US 2014) 
 Triangle (US 2014) 
 TysonPlus' I CanTell You Anything (US 2021)
 TysonPlus' The Scars Our Parents Leave (US 2021)
 TysonPlus' Boys Hurt Too (US 2021)
 TysonPlus' My Relationship with Death (US 2021)
Unclassified The Series (US 2017)
 Woman of Atlanta TV (US 2016)

References

Lists of LGBT-related films